Sunita Sharma is an Indian gymnast from Ambala, Haryana. She won the Arjuna Award in 1985 for her achievements in gymnastics.

See also 
Gymnastics in India
Arjuna Award

References 

Indian female artistic gymnasts
Living people
People from Ambala
Year of birth missing (living people)
Recipients of the Arjuna Award